Álvaro García Rodríguez (born 19 September 1961) is a Uruguayan politician.

Background

He has a professional background in both private and public sector appointments in finance and planning.

García also taught at two Uruguayan universities for a number of years.

He is a member of the Uruguayan Socialist Party.

Political role

He was Minister of Economy and Finance in the Frente Amplio Government of President of Uruguay Tabaré Vázquez, having taken office on 18 September 2008.

When García came to office, it was thought likely  that he would follow broadly the policies of his predecessor, Danilo Astori.

As of 1 March 2015, President Tabaré Vázquez appointed him as head of the Office of Planning and Budget.

See also

 Politics of Uruguay
 Broad Front (Uruguay)

References

 :es:Álvaro García (Uruguay)

University of the Republic (Uruguay) alumni
Academic staff of the University of the Republic (Uruguay)
Academic staff of Universidad ORT Uruguay
Uruguayan accountants
Uruguayan economists
1961 births
Living people
Socialist Party of Uruguay politicians
Ministers of Economics and Finance of Uruguay